The 2010 Omloop van Borsele was the 9th running of the Omloop van Borsele, a single-day women's cycling race. It was rated by the UCI as a 1.2 category race.

Results

Sources

See also
2010 in women's road cycling

References

External links

Omloop van Borsele
2010 in Dutch sport
2010 in women's road cycling